Diarsia calgary, the Calgary dart, is a moth of the family Noctuidae. The species was first described by Smith in 1898. It is found in North America in the mountains and foothills from Yukon, south to Arizona and New Mexico, west to the coast of British Columbia. There is a disjunct population in central western California.

The wingspan is about 30 mm.

References

Diarsia
Moths of North America
Moths described in 1898